Imre Deme (born 3 August 1983, in Zalaegerszeg) is a retired Hungarian football player..

References

External links
 Deme Imre (magyar), Hivatásos Labdarúgók Szervezete 
 Deme Imre, Nemzeti Sport 

1983 births
Living people
People from Zalaegerszeg
Hungarian footballers
Hungarian expatriate footballers
Association football midfielders
Hungary youth international footballers
Újpest FC players
Marcali VFC footballers
FC Tatabánya players
Ferencvárosi TC footballers
Soproni VSE players
Nemzeti Bajnokság I players
Hungary under-21 international footballers
Sportspeople from Zala County
Hungarian expatriate sportspeople in Austria
Expatriate footballers in Austria